NGC 3545B is an elliptical galaxy in the constellation Ursa Major. The object is close to NGC 3545.

See also 
 List of galaxies
 List of nearest galaxies
 List of NGC objects

References

Elliptical galaxies
3545B
Ursa Major (constellation)